Clark S. Smith (May 30, 1912 – October 28, 2014) was an American Republican politician who was a member of the Pennsylvania House of Representatives. He turned 100 in May 2012 and died in October 2014.

References

1912 births
2014 deaths
American centenarians
Republican Party members of the Pennsylvania House of Representatives
Men centenarians